Wu Weipei (born 4 March 1966) is a Chinese former cyclist. He competed in the team time trial at the 1988 Summer Olympics. Wu now works as a directeur sportif for UCI Women's Continental Team . He formerly held the same role with men's UCI Continental team , from 2012 to 2019.

References

External links
 
 Union Cycliste Internationale profile

1966 births
Living people
Chinese male cyclists
Olympic cyclists of China
Cyclists at the 1988 Summer Olympics
Place of birth missing (living people)
Asian Games medalists in cycling
Cyclists at the 1986 Asian Games
Cyclists at the 1990 Asian Games
Medalists at the 1986 Asian Games
Medalists at the 1990 Asian Games
Asian Games gold medalists for China
Asian Games silver medalists for China
20th-century Chinese people